Rauma Marine Constructions (RMC) is a Finnish shipbuilding company based in Rauma, Finland. The company's main products are car ferries, icebreakers and naval vessels.

History 

Rauma Marine Constructions was established by private investors with background in the Finnish shipbuilding industry shortly after STX Finland closed the Rauma shipyard in 2014. In December 2015, the company received a major equity investment when the state-owned investment company Finnish Industry Investment became a minor shareholder together with Finnish investment funds managed by Finda and Taaleritehdas. An existing minor shareholder Kasvattajarahasto, an investment fund managed by Aboa Venture Management, also increased its share on the company.

Orders

Ferries 

In June 2016, Rauma Marine Constructions and the Danish shipping company Molslinjen signed a 68 million euro contract for the construction of  roll-on/roll-off ferry for the Bornholm route. This was the first newbuilding contract awarded to Rauma after STX Finland announced the closure of the shipyard in 2013 and delivered the Finnish offshore patrol vessel Turva in 2014. The new ferry, Hammershus, was laid down on 4 August 2017, launched on 5 January 2018, and delivered in August 2018.

In October 2018, Rauma Marine Constructions and the Estonian ferry operator Tallink signed a letter of intent for the construction of an LNG-powered ferry with a capacity of 2,800 passengers for the Helsinki-Tallinn route. The 250 million euro shipbuilding contract was confirmed in March 2019. The  vessel, named MyStar, was initially scheduled to be delivered in early 2022. The steel cutting ceremony was held on 6 April 2020, the keel was laid on 18 September, and the vessel was launched on 12 August 2021. The delivery of the new ferry was delayed to 7 December 2022 and it began its maiden voyage from Tallinn on 13 December.

In early January 2019, another letter of intent was signed for a 120 million euro LNG-powered ferry for the Vaasa-Umeå route. The shipbuilding contract was signed on 21 January 2019 and the ice class 1A Super ferry would be delivered by May 2021. The vessel, named Aurora Botnia, was laid down on 13 February 2020 and launched on 11 September. The vessel's official christening and delivery ceremony was held in Vaasa immediately after sea trials on 25 August 2021.

In February 2020, a Memorandum of Understanding was signed between Rauma Marine Constructions and TT-Line for the construction of two new ferries for Tasmania. The construction of the 1,800-passenger ferries was expected to begin in early 2021. In July 2020, TT-Line advised this deal would not proceed due to the current and emerging economic problems caused by the COVID-19 pandemic; instead, the possibility of building the ferries locally in Australia was evaluated. However, in April 2021 TT-Line nonetheless signed a shipbuilding contract with Rauma Marine Constructions for two ferries with deliveries in late 2023 and late 2024. The construction of the first ferry, Spirit of Tasmania IV, began in February 2022 and the keel was laid on 28 October 2022. The construction of the second ferry, Spirit of Tasmania V, began in December 2022.

Naval vessels 

In September 2016, the Finnish Defense Forces Logistics Command signed a letter of intent with Rauma Marine Constructions in order to investigate the company's capability for building four multi-role corvettes for the Finnish Navy's Squadron 2020 fleet renewal program. In April 2017, this was followed by a 7.5 million euro design contract for the new Finnish surface combatant class that will replace three minelayers and four missile boats. A letter of intent for the construction contract was signed in the beginning of November 2018 and the final 647.6 million euro shipbuilding contract on 26 September 2019. The construction of the four-strong Pohjanmaa class will be staggered over 2022–2025 and full operational status is achieved in 2028.

Other 

Prior to major newbuilding orders, Rauma Marine Constructions completed a number of smaller construction and conversion projects to establish a subcontractor network and build the shipyard's capability for larger projects. These have included the construction of a floating entertainment center to the United Arab Emirates, conversion of the Finnish icebreaker Otso, and a facelift for the cruiseferries Silja Serenade and Silja Symphony. In May 2017, the shipyard was awarded the 13.7 million euro refitting of the Finnish research vessel Aranda.

List of ships built or on order

References

External links
 

Shipbuilding companies of Finland
Shipbuilding companies